Homalonotidae is a family of trilobites that lived from the Ordovician to the Devonian. They are characterised by a shovel-like cephalon (head), and are closely related to the family Calymenidae.

It contains the following genera:

Arduennella
Brongniartella
Burmeisterella
Burmeisteria
Digonus
Dipleura
Eohomalonotus
Homalonotus
Huemacaspis
Iberocoryphe
Kerfornella
Leiostegina
Parahomalonotus
Plaesiacomia
Platycoryphe
Scabrella
Trimerus

References

 
Calymenina
Trilobite families